Ernest Arthur Cowdrey (14 January 1902 – 5 October 1954) was an English first-class cricketer and tea plantation owner in British India He was the father of the England Test cricketer Colin Cowdrey.

Life and cricket
The son of Ernest Charles Cowdrey, he was born in British India at Calcutta in January 1902. He was educated at Whitgift School, where he played cricket and showed promise as a cricketer, moving his way up through the age groups at Beddington Cricket Club in Surrey. Cowdrey harboured dreams of playing the game professionally, but did not progress his cricket to that level. After finishing he education he found employment at a bank in the City of London, before progressing to stockbroking where he bought and sold tea stocks. He met his future wife, Kathleen Mary Taylor, at Beddington Cricket Club, with the couple later marrying. The couple moved to India after they were married, with Cowdrey setting up a tea plantation high in the Nilgiri Mountains, 100 miles from Bangalore. He played first-class cricket in India for the Europeans cricket team, making a single appearance against the Indians at Madras in January 1927 in the Madras Presidency Match. Batting twice in the match, he was dismissed for 9 runs in the Europeans first innings by M. Venkataramanjulu, while in their second innings he was unbeaten on 27. In the Indians first innings he bowled 11 overs, going wicketless. He would often drive the ten hours to Madras to play club cricket, a perilous undertaking on the narrow and unpaved roads in the mountains. The Great Depression hit the tea industry hard, with prices dropping by over 50%, however Cowdrey was able to maintain the plantation, though the Second World War again hit the plantation, with the young English managers joining the war effort. In later life he suffered from a bad heart, passing away in England in October 1954 at Sutton.

Family
Cowdrey was the start of a cricketing dynasty, with his son Colin being born at the tea plantation in December 1932. Colin would go onto captain England in Test cricket; many stories circulate about his early relationship with Colin, including his determination for Colin to become a professional cricketer, or his writing to a friend back in England to place Colin's name down for membership of the Marylebone Cricket Club shortly after he was born. Colin would go onto have two sons who would play cricket, Chris and Graham; Chris too would play for and captain England in Test cricket. Later generations to play the game include his great-grandson Fabian Cowdrey.

References

External links

1902 births
1954 deaths
People from Kolkata
People educated at Whitgift School
English bankers
English stockbrokers
English expatriates in India
Businesspeople in tea
English cricketers
Europeans cricketers